Wilfried Bedfian (born 9 July 2001) is a professional footballer who plays as a goalkeeper. Born in France, he represents Cameroon internationally.

Career
On 29 November 2018, Bedfian signed his first professional contract with Châteauroux. He made his professional debut with Châteauroux in a 3–1 Coupe de la Ligue loss to Chamois Niortais F.C. on 13 August 2019.

International career
Born in France, Bedfian is of Cameroonian descent. He was called up to represent the Cameroon U20s at the 2021 Africa U-20 Cup of Nations.

References

External links
 

Living people
2001 births
Footballers from Paris
Cameroonian footballers
Cameroon youth international footballers
French footballers
French sportspeople of Cameroonian descent
Citizens of Cameroon through descent
Association football goalkeepers
LB Châteauroux players
Ligue 2 players
Championnat National 3 players